The Story So Far is a compilation album by American performance artist Divine, originally released in 1984. It is Divine's most successful album on both sides of the Atlantic.

With songwriting and music production by Mike Stock, Matt Aitken, and Pete Waterman (collectively known as Stock Aitken Waterman), as well as Bobby Orlando, the album became especially sought-after by avid synthesizer-based club/dance music fans. The album includes the hit single "You Think You're a Man," which reached number 16 on the UK Singles Chart.

Track listing
List of tracks:

Notes
 The 1988 Receiver Records CD reissue omits the Stock Aitken Waterman produced tracks, namely "I'm So Beautiful" and "You Think You're a Man."

References

Divine (performer) albums
1984 albums
Albums produced by Stock Aitken Waterman
Bellaphon Records albums